The 1981 ICF Canoe Slalom World Championships were held in Bala, Wales, Great Britain under the auspices of International Canoe Federation. It was the 17th edition. The mixed C2 event was reinstated after not being held at the previous championships.

Medal summary

Men's

Canoe

Kayak

Mixed

Canoe

Women's

Kayak

Medals table

References
Official results
International Canoe Federation

From this site you will be able to download the Historical vintage  film  ‘rushes’ from the world Championships that made up ‘ Think Slalom’

Canoe
Canoe Slalom World Championships, 1981
ICF Canoe Slalom World Championships
Canoe Slalom World
Icf Canoe Slalom World Championships, 1981
Canoeing and kayaking competitions in the United Kingdom
Canoeing in Wales